Hypocrita celina is a moth of the family Erebidae first described by Jean Baptiste Boisduval in 1870. It is found in Guatemala.

References

Moths described in 1870
Hypocrita